James Fender is a Welsh rugby union player, currently playing for RFU Championship side Cornish Pirates. His preferred position is lock.

Career
As a youth player, Fender was part of the Ospreys academy. He played for South Gower and Neath Port Talbot College, as well as Swansea RFC.

For the 2022–2023 season, Fender was loaned to RFU Championship side Cornish Pirates.

Fender represented Wales U20 in the U20 Six Nations tournament in 2020 and 2021.

Fender was recalled to the Ospreys squad ahead of their URC tour to South Africa, and made his debut as a replacement on 26 November 2022, against the Bulls.

External links
James Fender profile
Wales U20 profile

References

2001 births
Living people
Rugby union locks
Rugby union players from Swansea
Welsh rugby union players
Cornish Pirates players
Ospreys (rugby union) players